Armor is a superhero appearing in American comic books published by Marvel Comics. Created by Joss Whedon and John Cassaday, the character first appeared in Astonishing X-Men vol. 3 #4. Armor is a Japanese mutant who enrolled at the Xavier Institute as a teenager and retained her powers after the events of Decimation.

Publication history
Armor first appeared in Astonishing X-Men vol. 3 #4, and was created by Joss Whedon and John Cassaday.

Fictional character biography

Student at Xavier's
Hisako Ichiki is a young girl whose greatest aspiration is one day to join the X-Men. While it was originally thought that Hisako was not a member of any of the X-Men's various training squads, a 2010 handbook entry reveals that she was a member of Kitty Pryde's Paladins squad.

Along with her friend and fellow student, Wing (whom, after his death, she later describes as being her best friend), Hisako is attacked in the halls of the Xavier Institute by the alien villain Ord of the Breakworld. Hisako and Wing attempt to oppose Ord, but are overpowered.  While both teenagers survive the attack, Wing discovers that he has been injected with a "cure" for his mutant ability of flight. Despondent, he commits suicide after some goading from a Danger Room hologram of her. In the wake of this tragedy, Hisako, her teacher Kitty Pryde, and several Xavier students find themselves trapped in a sentient and hostile Danger Room with Wing's reanimated corpse. Danger, as the intelligence is named by the X-Men, eventually leaves the institute.

When M-Day hit, she was one of 27 students to retain their powers. She participated in Emma Frost's Battle Royale which determined who will train to be a part of the X-Men. Hisako later appeared alongside the New X-Men when the Acolytes attack the mansion. Her appearance is extremely brief and with no dialogue. She is recognizable only because she "Armors up" during the fight.

Member of the X-Men
Hisako finds classmate Blindfold "crying" in the restroom.  While trying to comfort Blindfold, Blindfold tries to convince Hisako that they are soon "to lose another one," as Wolverine, believing he is a defenseless child due to the manipulations of Cassandra Nova, barges into the restroom, followed closely by the feral Beast. Beast attacks Blindfold, but Hisako uses her powers to fight off Beast with a large blast of psionic energy from her psi-body armor. Exhausting herself, she faints. Blindfold tells Hisako that someone is awake in the infirmary; they find the unconscious bodies of Colossus and Cyclops.

Soon after, both Ord and Danger attack the mansion, where they are confronted by Hisako and then Wolverine where the young girl holds her own only to be wounded by Wolverine's claws. Although she only receives minor injuries, when Cassandra Nova chooses Hisako to be her new host body. It is unknown if Cassandra was successful in getting Emma Frost to transfer her consciousness into Hisako, as S.W.O.R.D. beams the team, Danger, Ord, and Hisako into a spaceship headed for the Breakworld.

The team and Hisako find that S.W.O.R.D. have abducted the X-Men and Hisako because they need heroes to fight a threat: Breakworld has a weapon capable of destroying the Earth. Ord sends the ship's coordinates to Breakworld's ruler, and he sends a fleet to attack the ship. The ship is heavily damaged and the X-Men are separated. Hisako ends up with Wolverine. Hisako is given membership to the X-Men and Shadowcat's uniform.

Later, Wolverine and Armor are captured as Emma and the remaining X-Men try to free Cyclops. It is then revealed through a flashback that Leviathan is a fake and that Wolverine and Armor were told to be captured so the X-Men would have men inside Kruun's palace. Kruun only captured and brought Cyclops back to life so as to question him about the fake Leviathan. Cyclops then uses his newly regained powers to knock out Kruun and free Wolverine and Armor.

Back on earth, Armor attempts to console Wolverine after losing Shadowcat by forcing him to fight/train with her.

Messiah Complex

During Messiah Complex, some of the New X-Men launch a pre-emptive strike against the Purifiers. Hisako joins them and while spying on the Purifers, she is impressed by X-23’s senses. After breaking into the Washington base and getting into a brief tussle with the Purifers they are ambushed by the Reavers, who wound Hellion. Pixie manages to teleport the team out and are spread between Washington and the Institute.

Hisako is brought back to the mansion by Iceman with the other New X-Men. When Predator X showed up at the mansion, Hisako teamed up with Gentle and battled it in the infirmary. Pixie believes X-23 can defeat the monster and teleports it and the entire team, along with Hisako, to the battle between the Marauders and the X-Teams taking place on Muir Island.

Manifest Destiny

Hisako is currently a full member of the X-Men and is working alongside them in San Francisco. She is currently receiving classes from Wolverine in combat and classes from Cyclops in tactics. She is thinking of changing her codename because Wolverine keeps mocking her for her choice of Armor. She later accompanies the team to a spaceship graveyard known as Chaparanga where she performs a fastball special with Wolverine and confronts a mysterious man, dubbed Subject X  who they find fixing and restarting the eponymous "ghost box" in a spaceship. Subject X is defeated but kills himself rather than surrender information about his intentions and "the Annex."

The X-Men locate Tian, which is an uncharted area of China that no surveillance or satellite system can get through, not even the Chinese government or Cerebra. The X-Men are able to sneak into Tian and discover the headquarters of a group of mutants from another dimension. Sadly, they seem to be dying because of the effects of M-Day.

As Armor and Logan go off to search the temple for anyone else, they come across a man who can fire lasers from his fingers. Armor is shocked when the laser goes through her armor and hits her in the arm. After the X-Men take down their foes, they reveal to the X-Men they have a mutual friend, Forge. After finding Forge on Mt. Wundegore and discovering he has gone mad, he tries to open the Ghost Box. Thanks to the assistance of Abigail Brand and Beast, who borrows Hisako's phone, Brand fires a world-destroying laser at the Ghost Box and the phone, destroying it as well as much of the area while the X-Men escape.

She is also sharing a room with Pixie and X-23. During an attack by the Red Queen's Sisterhood, Armor is shown scared and hiding with X-23 when they are attacked by Chimera only to be teleported out by Pixie before her attack could succeed.

Utopia

Hisako is seen watching the protests between Humanity Now and Pro-Mutant Rights protestors. Hisako is then seen during the riots in San Francisco with Karma, Match, Angel and Bling! trying to keep calm. She is later made a part of a team by Cyclops to take down the Dark X-Men and participates in the final fight against Norman Osborn's forces, teaming up with X-23 and Pixie in taking on Daken.<ref>Dark Avengers/Uncanny X-Men: Exodus One-shot</ref>

Powers and abilities
Hisako can create and generate an enormously strong and impenetrable dark red-colored psionic exoskeleton body armor. It grants her superhuman strength, reflexes, stamina, endurance, agility, dexterity, and durability. The body armor is depicted as enveloping her completely and protects her from tremendously strong and powerful attacks and greatly strengthens and amplifies the concussive force behind her unusually offensive and highly destructive blows. In some depictions, her psionic armor grants her enough strength to lift a Skrull ground tank and punch someone through several walls of a building.

Hisako's armor is strong and durable enough to survive the heat caused from a long fall through the atmosphere. Likewise, she is able to fully withstand the impact from falling to the ground from high up in the atmosphere without any physical or external injury. She can also cause her armor to release a large amount of solid, concussive energy at once, though this is initially a difficult task. Her armor is vulnerable to lasers, which are able to pass through it and harm her. This vulnerability is explained when she states later that her armor still has to let light through.

Adamantium is also able to pierce through Hisako's armor, such as Wolverine's claws, although he is not able to go through it with the rest of his body. In this case, she only remained uninjured because the distance between her armor's perimeter and her body was slightly greater than the length of Wolverine's claws. She can shape her armor, such as her ability to form Wolverine-like claws and make them extend outward. In instances of extreme duress, Hisako is also able to expand her armor, greatly strengthening and increasing its size and shape around her, though her own body remains the same at its center.

Hisako's body armor is partially explained as being composed of something related to her family lineage and ancestors. It is later described as being composed of memory. This is stated in an issue of Wolverine: Origins, when Hisako's armor is able to withstand blows from the Muramasa blade, which can cut through any material, since memory is "the only material that the blade cannot cut through." Similarly, in Astonishing X-Men vol. 3 #39, Armor's armor expands and grows to the size of a building due to the fact she feels strongly about not attending her recently deceased mother and brother's wake.

Hisako has also received combat training from Wolverine and classes in tactics from Cyclops.

 Reception 

 Critical reception 
George Marston of Newsarama included Armor in their "20 X-Men characters that should make the jump from Marvel comics to the MCU" list. Marc Buxton of Den of Geek included Armor in their "40 X-Men Characters Who Haven’t Appeared in the Movies But Should" list. CBR.com ranked Armor 5th in their "10 Best X-Men Mutants Who Haven't Been In A Movie Yet" list, 5th in their "10 X-Men That Are Surprisingly More Powerful Than Hulk" list, 6th in their "10 Powerful X-Mutants Who Still Haven’t Shown Up On The Big Screen" list, 7th in their "X-Men: 10 Classic Mutants The MCU Needs To Introduce ASAP" list, 9th in their "10 Most Powerful Female X-Men" list, 9th in their "Marvel's 15 Fiercest Female Mutants" list, 9th in their "15 Most Powerful Ultimate Universe X-Men" list, 12th in their "20 Most Physically Strong Mutants" list, 15th in their "X-Men: The 15 Strongest Members Ever" list, 17th in their "25 Strongest Marvel Mutants" list, and 23rd in their "25 Most Powerful Young X-Men" list. Darren Franich of Entertainment Weekly ranked Armor 58th in their "Let's rank every X-Man ever" list.

Other versions

Leader of the X-Men
In Runaways, a time-displaced future version of Gertrude Yorkes mentioned a future team of X-Men led by Hisako. Like Gertrude's Avengers, they were decimated by the villainous incarnation of Victor Mancha, known as "Victorious."  Hisako and Gert are stated to be the last of the X-Men and Avengers, respectively and Hisako mentions that she does not have enough energy to generate her armor in a fight against Victorious.

Ghost Boxes
In a variation of the Ghost Boxes storyline, two alternate versions of Hisako have been depicted. The first is a different ending to Astonishing X-Men vol. 3 #26. Cyclops and Wolverine are taken out by the Annex. The Annex then opens a Ghost Box and a Sentinel merged Magneto comes through and kills Emma Frost and Storm leaving Hisako the only surviving member of the Astonishing X-Men.

In another alternate future, set 5 years after the Annex destroy the world, Hisako, Beast, who now has a childlike mentality, and Wolverine, who uses a wheelchair, are the last people on Earth. Kitty Pryde apparently returns to Earth and organizes an evacuation. After traveling to the evacuation point and finding out it was really a trap, Hisako breaks Beast's neck and burns Wolverine until his healing factor cancels out and dies leaving her as the last of the X-Men and possibly the last person on Earth.

Ultimate Marvel
The Ultimate version of Hisako first appears as a young Japanese child being held captive in one of William Stryker's Mutant internment camps. After being rescued by Iceman and Husk, she joins their Mutant resistance movement. In this continuity, Hisako's energy armor takes the form of a large, glowing dragon. When the Ultimate Universe was destroyed, Armor was one of the few inhabitants to slip through the cracks of reality and ended up in the Prime universe. Disorientated and slightly amnesic from her ordeal, she was found by the villain Miss Sinister and brainwashed. Operating as part of Miss Sinister's New Marauders, she was forced to attack the X-Men against her will.

In other media

 Television 

 Armor appears in Marvel Anime: X-Men, voiced by Yukari Tamura in the Japanese version and Stephanie Sheh in the English dub. This version's parents hired Emma Frost to help Armor control her powers and later give her their blessing to join the X-Men as a junior member.

 Video games 

 Armor appears in the digital collectible card game Marvel Snap''.

References

External links
 
 

Characters created by Joss Whedon
Comics characters introduced in 2004
Fictional Buddhists
Japanese superheroes
Marvel Comics characters who have mental powers
Marvel Comics characters with superhuman strength
Marvel Comics martial artists
Marvel Comics mutants
Marvel Comics female superheroes